A.S.I.A. are a Romanian girlgroup founded on March 8, 1999, and disbanded in 2006. The name of the group is an acronym of the first names of the four singers who made up the original line-up: Anca, Sorana, Irina, Anemona.

The group made a comeback in 2023. Currently the group's acronym reflects the current form of the group's line-up: Anca, Sorana, Ianna, Anemona.

Lineups 
1999–2000

 Anca Neacșu
 Sorana Mohamad
 Irina Nicolae
 Anemona Niculescu

2000–2002

 Anca Neacșu
 Sorana Mohamad
 Irina Nicolae
 Alexandra Potora

2002–2003

 Anca Neacșu
 Sorana Mohamad
 Irina Nicolae
 Alina Crișan

2003–2005

 Silvia Sârbu
 Sorana Mohamad
 Irina Nicolae
 Alina Crișan

2005–2006

 Silvia Sârbu
 Sorana Mohamad
 Ianna Novac
 Alina Crișan

Discography

Studio albums 

 A.S.I.A. (1999)
 Periculos (2000)
 Nopți albe (2000)
 Iubiri adevărate (2001)
 Eu, tu și ... Luna de pe cer (2002)
 Urban (2004)
 Shanana (2005)

Compilations 

 A.S.I.A. Collection (2001)
 A.S.I.A. FM (2002)
 Best Of A.S.I.A. (2023)

References 

Romanian musical groups